Cedarville is a village in Stephenson County, Illinois, United States. The population was 741 at the 2010 census, up from 719 in 2000. It is the birthplace of social activist Jane Addams, the 1931 Nobel Peace Prize winner.

Geography

Cedarville is located at  (42.375078, -89.633823).

Demographics

As of the census of 2010, there were 741 people, 290 households, and 216 families residing in the village. The racial makeup of the village was 98.75% White, 0.14% Native American and 1.11% Asian. Hispanic or Latino of any race were 0.14% of the population.

There were 290 households, out of which 29.3% had children under the age of 18 living with them, 69.0% were married couples living together, 2.8% had a female householder with no husband present, and 25.5% were non-families. 21.0% of all households were made up of individuals, and 8.3% had someone living alone who was 65 years of age or older.  The average household size was 2.48 and the average family size was 2.89.

In the village, the population was spread out, with 22.7% under the age of 18, 7.0% from 18 to 24, 30.9% from 25 to 44, 25.6% from 45 to 64, and 13.9% who were 65 years of age or older.  The median age was 38 years. For every 100 females, there were 99.2 males.  For every 100 females age 18 and over, there were 96.5 males.

The median income for a household in the village was $44,609, and the median income for a family was $49,821. Males had a median income of $37,500 versus $25,481 for females. The per capita income for the village was $20,076.  Below the poverty line were 2.6% of people, 2.2% of families, 1.2% of those under 18 and 3.8% of those over 64.

See also

Hull House
Jane Addams
Jane Addams Burial Site
John H. Addams
John H. Addams Homestead

References

External links

 
Villages in Stephenson County, Illinois
Villages in Illinois